Carrizalillo is a city in the southwestern state of Guerrero, Mexico.The height over sea level of Carrizalillo is 1520 meters.

In November 2015, the town came under spotlight when it was announced by Guerreros Unidos, that there is a clandestine cemetery there, possibly containing the bodies of several students who disappeared after the 2014 Iguala mass kidnapping.

References

External links

Populated places in Guerrero